This is a list of symphony orchestras that includes orchestras with established notability. A list of youth orchestras can be found at List of youth orchestras.

Africa

Democratic Republic of the Congo
Orchestre Symphonique Kimbanguiste

Egypt
Cairo Symphony Orchestra

Ghana
National Symphony Orchestra Ghana
Pan-African Orchestra

Morocco
Moroccan Philharmonic Orchestra

South Africa
Cape Philharmonic Orchestra 
Johannesburg Philharmonic Orchestra
Johannesburg Youth Orchestra
KwaZulu-Natal Philharmonic Orchestra
South African National Youth Orchestra Foundation

Tunisia
 Tunisian Symphony Orchestra

North America and the Caribbean

Canada
Calgary Philharmonic Orchestra
CBC Radio Orchestra
Edmonton Symphony Orchestra
Esprit Orchestra
Georgian Bay Symphony
Hamilton Philharmonic Orchestra
I Musici de Montréal Chamber Orchestra
Kanata Symphony Orchestra
Kingston Symphony
Kitchener–Waterloo Symphony
Manitoba Chamber Orchestra
Montreal Symphony Orchestra (Orchestre symphonique de Montréal)
Montreal Youth Symphony Orchestra (Orchestre symphonique des jeunes de Montréal)
National Arts Centre Orchestra
Newfoundland Symphony Orchestra
Oakville Symphony Orchestra
Orchestra London Canada
Orchestre de la Francophonie
Orchestre Métropolitain
Orchestre Symphonique de Québec (Quebec Symphony Orchestra)
Ottawa Symphony Orchestra
Prince George Symphony Orchestra
Regina Symphony Orchestra
Saskatoon Symphony Orchestra
Saskatoon Youth Orchestra
Sault Symphony Orchestra
Sherbrooke Symphony Orchestra (Orchestre Symphonique de Sherbrooke)
Symphony New Brunswick
Symphony Nova Scotia
Thunder Bay Symphony Orchestra
Tafelmusik Baroque Orchestra
Toronto Symphony Orchestra
Toronto Symphony Youth Orchestra
Vancouver Symphony Orchestra
Vancouver Youth Symphony Orchestra
Victoria Symphony
Winnipeg Symphony Orchestra
Windsor Symphony Orchestra

Cuba
National Symphony Orchestra of Cuba

Mexico
Orquesta de Baja California
Orquesta Filarmónica de Jalisco (Jalisco Philharmonic Orchestra)
Orquesta Filarmónica de la Ciudad de México
Orquesta Filarmónica de Querétaro
Orquesta Sinfónica de Xalapa
Orquesta Sinfónica de Yucatán
Orquesta Sinfónica del Estado de México 
Orquesta Sinfónica Nacional

Puerto Rico
Orquesta Sinfónica de Puerto Rico

Trinidad and Tobago
St Augustine Chamber Orchestra

United States

South and Central America
YOA Orchestra of the Americas

Argentina
Argentine National Symphony Orchestra
Buenos Aires Philharmonic
Juan de Dios Filiberto National Orchestra of Argentine Music
Olavarria Symphony Orchestra (Orquesta Sinfónica Municipal de Olavarría)

Bolivia
Oruro Symphony Orchestra

Brazil
Amazonas Philharmonic
Brazilian Symphony Orchestra
Porto Alegre Symphony Orchestra
São Paulo State Symphony Orchestra

Colombia
Bogota Philharmonic
Cali Philharmonic Orchestra
National Symphony Orchestra of Colombia

Peru
National Symphony Orchestra

Venezuela
Grand Marshal of Ayacucho Symphony Orchestra
Mérida State Symphony Orchestra
Simón Bolívar Symphony Orchestra
Venezuela Symphony Orchestra

Asia

Pan-Asia
Asian Youth Orchestra
Arab Youth Philharmonic Orchestra
West-Eastern Divan

Azerbaijan
 Azerbaijan State Chamber Orchestra
 Azerbaijan State Orchestra of Folk Instruments
 Azerbaijan State Symphony Orchestra

Cambodia
Angkor National Youth Orchestra

China
Beijing Symphony Orchestra
Central Philharmonic Orchestra
China National Symphony Orchestra
China NCPA Orchestra 
China Philharmonic Orchestra
Guangzhou Symphony Orchestra
Guiyang Symphony Orchestra
Hangzhou Philharmonic Orchestra 
Harbin Symphony Orchestra
National Ballet of China Symphony Orchestra
Qingdao Symphony Orchestra
Shanghai Chinese Orchestra
Shanghai City Symphony Orchestra
Shanghai Philharmonic Orchestra
Shanghai Symphony Orchestra
Shenzhen Symphony Orchestra
Sichuan Symphony Orchestra
Xiamen Philharmonic Orchestra

Hong Kong
City Chamber Orchestra of Hong Kong
Pan Asia Symphony Orchestra
Hong Kong Chamber Orchestra
Hong Kong Festival Orchestra
Hong Kong Philharmonic Orchestra
Hong Kong Sinfonietta
Metropolitan Youth Orchestra of Hong Kong

India
India National Youth Orchestra
Symphony Orchestra of India
Calcutta Chamber Orchestra

Indonesia
The Jakarta Symphony

Iran
National Orchestra
Tehran Symphony Orchestra
Iranian Orchestra for New Music
Melal Orchestra

Israel
Israel Philharmonic Orchestra
Jerusalem Symphony Orchestra
Rishon LeZion Orchestra (see also Rishon LeZion Orchestra on the Hebrew WP)

Japan
Hiroshima Symphony Orchestra
Hyogo Performing Arts Center Orchestra
Japan Philharmonic Orchestra
Kanagawa Philharmonic Orchestra
Nagoya Philharmonic Orchestra
New Japan Philharmonic
NHK Symphony Orchestra, Tokyo
Orchestra Ensemble Kanazawa
Osaka Philharmonic Orchestra
Saito Kinen Orchestra
Sapporo Symphony Orchestra
Tokyo Metropolitan Symphony Orchestra
Tokyo Philharmonic Orchestra
Tokyo Symphony Orchestra
Yomiuri Nippon Symphony Orchestra

Lebanon
Lebanese National Symphony Orchestra

Macau
Macao Orchestra

Malaysia
Malaysian Philharmonic Orchestra
Malaysian Philharmonic Youth Orchestra
KLPac Orchestra
Penang Philharmonic Orchestra

Mongolia
Mongolian Symphony Orchestra

Myanmar
 Myanmar National Symphony Orchestra

North Korea
 State Symphony Orchestra of the Democratic People's Republic of Korea

Philippines
ABS-CBN Philharmonic Orchestra
De La Salle Zobel Symphony Orchestra
Manila Symphony Orchestra
Manila Philharmonic Orchestra
Philippine Philharmonic Orchestra
San Miguel Philharmonic Orchestra

Qatar
Qatar Philharmonic Orchestra

Russia
 Mariinsky Theatre Orchestra
 Moscow Chamber Orchestra
 Moscow City Symphony Orchestra
 Moscow Philharmonic Orchestra
 Moscow State Symphony Orchestra
 Moscow Symphony Orchestra
 Moscow Virtuosi
 Murmansk Philharmonic Orchestra
 National Philharmonic of Russia
 Novosibirsk Philharmonic Orchestra
 Novosibirsk Youth Symphony Orchestra
 Osipov State Russian Folk Orchestra
 Persimfans
 Russian National Orchestra
 Russian Philharmonic Orchestra
 Sochi Symphony Orchestra
 Saint Petersburg Academic Symphony Orchestra
 Saint Petersburg Philharmonic Orchestra
 State Academic Symphony Orchestra of the Russian Federation
 State Symphony Capella of Russia
 State Symphony Cinema Orchestra
 Tchaikovsky Symphony Orchestra
 Ural Philharmonic Orchestra

Singapore
Braddell Heights Symphony Orchestra
Orchestra of the Music Makers
Singapore Symphony Orchestra
Singapore National Youth Orchestra

South Korea 
Bucheon Philharmonic Orchestra
KBS Symphony Orchestra
Seoul Philharmonic Orchestra

Sri Lanka
Symphony Orchestra of Sri Lanka

Syria
Syrian National Orchestra for Arabic Music
Syrian National Symphony Orchestra

Taiwan
 Chamber Philharmonic Taipei
 Chimei Philharmonic Orchestra
 Evergreen Symphony Orchestra
 Kaohsiung City Symphony Orchestra
 National Chinese Orchestra Taiwan
 National Symphony Orchestra (also known as Taiwan Philharmonic)
 National Taiwan Symphony Orchestra
 Taipei Century Symphony Orchestra
 Taipei Chinese Orchestra
 Taipei Philharmonic Orchestra
 Taipei Symphony Orchestra

Turkmenistan
 State Symphony Orchestra of Turkmenistan

Thailand
 Siam Philharmonic Orchestra
 Thailand Philharmonic Orchestra

United Arab Emirates
UAE Philharmonic Orchestra (previously known as Dubai Philharmonic Orchestra)

Vietnam
 Vietnam National Symphony Orchestra

Europe

Oceania

Australia
Adelaide Symphony Orchestra
Adelaide Youth Orchestra
Australian Chamber Orchestra
Australian Opera and Ballet Orchestra
Australian Youth Orchestra
Brisbane Philharmonic Orchestra
Canberra Symphony Orchestra
Darwin Symphony Orchestra
Eminence Symphony Orchestra
Melbourne Symphony Orchestra
Orchestra Victoria
Queensland Symphony Orchestra
Queensland Youth Orchestras
RMIT Symphonic Orchestra
SBS Radio and Television Youth Orchestra
Sydney Symphony Orchestra
Sydney University Symphony Orchestra
Sydney Youth Orchestra
Tasmanian Symphony Orchestra
Western Australian Charity Orchestra
West Australian Symphony Orchestra
Wollongong Symphony Orchestra

New Zealand
Auckland Symphony Orchestra
Auckland Philharmonia Orchestra
Christchurch Symphony Orchestra
New Zealand Symphony Orchestra

See also
List of concert halls
List of principal conductors by orchestra
List of radio orchestras

References

Symphony orchestras
Symphony orchestras